The 1st World Sports Acrobatics Championships were held in Moscow, USSR, in 1974.

Results

Men's Tumbling

Overall

First Exercise

Second Exercise

Men's Pair

Overall

First Exercise

Second Exercise

Men's Group

Overall

First Exercise

Second Exercise

Women's Tumbling

Overall

First Exercise

Second Exercise

Women's Pair

Overall

First Exercise

Second Exercise

Women's Group

Overall

First Exercise

Second Exercise

Mixed Pair

Overall

First Exercise

Second Exercise

References
sports acrobatics : 1974 World Championships

Acrobatic Gymnastics Championships
Acrobatic Gymnastics World Championships
1974 in Soviet sport
International gymnastics competitions hosted by the Soviet Union